Cotinis boylei is a species of the Cotinis subgenus Criniflava.

References

Cetoniinae
Beetles of North America
Beetles described in 1966